Aerotucan is a Mexican airline based in Oaxaca, Oaxaca.

History 
The airline was founded in 2001 and it began operations with a single Cessna Grand Caravan.

Fleet
Servicios Especiales Company website - Jets, accessdate 19.September 2020

Destinations 
Huatulco
Ixtepec
Oaxaca
Puerto Escondido

References

External links
 "Aerotucan detiene planes de expansión por crisis financiera", 29 October 2008, Tiempo
 Isai Lopez, "Busca Aerotucán interconexión estatal", 20 March 2010, El Heraldo de Chiapas
 Official Website

Airlines established in 2001
Airlines of Mexico
Companies based in Oaxaca
Transportation in Oaxaca